Guatemala Department is one of the 22 departments of Guatemala.  The capital is Guatemala City, which also serves as the national capital.  The department consists of Guatemala City and several of its suburbs.

Municipalities 

 Amatitlán
 Chinautla
 Chuarrancho
 Fraijanes
 Guatemala City
 Mixco
 Palencia
 San José del Golfo
 San José Pinula
 San Juan Sacatepéquez
 San Miguel Petapa
 San Pedro Ayampuc
 San Pedro Sacatepéquez
 San Raymundo
 Santa Catarina Pinula
 Villa Canales
 Villa Nueva

References

 
Departments of Guatemala